Juan Pablo Magallanes Moreno (born December 17, 1978) is a Mexican actor known for his appearances in different chapters of "La Rosa De Guadalupe" and "Mujer, Casos de la Vida Real"

Biography
Juan Pablo Magallanes Moreno was born in Ciudad Obregón, Sonora, Mexico. He studied architecture but his passion was acting, he graduated from the exclusive Televisa Acting School Centro de Educación Artística (CEA) and his first job was on the telenovela Mujeres engañadas

In 2001 he participated in the telenovela El Juego de la Vida, and a year later starred as 'Hugo Salcedo' in the teen drama Clase 406.

In 2003 he had a special participation in Velo de Novia, and in 2004 participated in Mujer de Madera.

He participated in the telenovela En Nombre Del Amor playing the role of 'Aaron Eugene Cortázar' in 2008, and a year later had some appearances on the hit telenovela Hasta Que El Dinero Nos Separe alongside Pedro Fernández and Itatí Cantoral.

In 2011 Emilio Larrosa invited him to join the cast of "Dos Hogares" in the role of Óscar Lagos.

Filmography
2001: El Juego de la Vida
2002: Clase 406 as Hugo Salcedo
2003: Velo de Novia as Raúl Paz
2003–2005: Mujer, Casos de la Vida Real
2004: Mujer de Madera as Valentin Calderón
2008: La Rosa De Guadalupe as Iván (Episode: "Aliviánate")
2008–2009: En Nombre del Amor as Aarón Eugenio Cortázar
2009: Hasta Que el Dinero Nos Separe as Sergio
2011: El Equipo as Javier Macedo
2011-2012: Dos Hogares as Óscar Lagos Urbina
2012 Como dice el dicho as Brandon

External links 
 
 http://www2.esmas.com/entretenimiento/biografias/294835/pablo-magallanes
 http://televisa.esmas.com/entretenimiento/telenovelas/dos-hogares/fotos/conoce-mas-de-pablo-magallanes/29892

1978 births
Mexican male television actors
Mexican male telenovela actors
People from Ciudad Obregón
Male actors from Sonora
Living people
21st-century Mexican actors